Yeo Jun-hyung (born on 25 September 1983) is a South Korean former short track speed skater. He is World Champion, Asian Winter Games champion and Universiade champion.

Yeo's only individual World Cup podium was second place in the 1000 m race at the 2002-03 World Cup stage in Chuncheon. He also finished once second and once third in relay competitions during the next two seasons (one podium by season). He participated only once at the World Championships: in 2002, he won gold in the men's relay.

In 2012, Yeo was named as US National Team interim coach. In 2014, he worked as coach in South Korea.

References

External links
 Yeo's profile
 Yeo's statistics

1983 births
Living people
South Korean male short track speed skaters
Universiade medalists in short track speed skating
Medalists at the 2005 Winter Universiade
Asian Games medalists in short track speed skating
Short track speed skaters at the 2003 Asian Winter Games
Medalists at the 2003 Asian Winter Games
Asian Games gold medalists for South Korea
21st-century South Korean people
Universiade gold medalists for South Korea